Turneja 2005: Sarajevo, Zagreb, Beograd (trans. 2005 Tour: Sarajevo, Zagreb, Belgrade) is the fourth live album by Yugoslav rock band Bijelo Dugme, released in 2006. The album was recorded on Bijelo Dugme 2005 reunion tour, and is the band's first release (excluding compilation albums) since the 1988 studio album Ćiribiribela.

Background
Bijelo Dugme disbanded in 1989, two years before the Yugoslav Wars broke out. During the following decade, the band's former leader, Goran Bregović, stated on numerous occasions that he will not reunite Bijelo Dugme. However, in 2005, Bijelo Dugme reunited, featuring most of the musicians that passed through the band: Goran Bregović on guitar, Željko Bebek, Mladen Vojičić "Tifa" and Alen Islamović on vocals, Zoran Redžić on bass guitar, Milić Vukašinović and Điđi Jankelić on drums and Vlado Pravdić and Laza Ristovski on keyboards. The reunited Bijelo Dugme did not feature bass guitarist Jadranko Stanković, who was a member of the original Bijelo Dugme lineup, but spent only several months with the band, drummer Ipe Ivandić, who died in 1994, as well as short-term touring musicians, bass guitarists Mustafa "Mute" Kurtalić, Ljubiša Racić and Sanin Karić and drummer Garabet Tavitjan.

The reunion saw large media attention in all former Yugoslav republics. The band held only three concerts: in Sarajevo, at Koševo stadium, Zagreb, at Maksimir stadium, and Belgrade, at Belgrade Hippodrome. The concerts featured a string orchestra, a brass band, klapa group Nostalgija and two female singers from Bregovć's Weddings and Funerals Orchestra. The concert in Sarajevo attracted about 60,000 people, and the concert in Zagreb was attended by more than 70,000 people. For the concert in Belgrade, more than 220,000 tickets were sold, but it was later estimated that it was attended by more than 250,000 people. However, the concert in Belgrade was much criticized because of the bad sound. Turneja 2005: Sarajevo, Zagreb, Beograd features recordings from these concerts.

Album cover
Turneja 2005: Sarajevo, Zagreb, Beograd is one of two Bijelo Dugme album covers (the other one being a cover of their 1977 live album Koncert kod Hajdučke česme) which does not feature the band's logo designed by Dragan S. Stefanović. The medal on the cover of the slipcase is the Yugoslav Order of the People's Hero.

Track listings

CD1

CD2

Personnel
Goran Bregović - guitar, acoustic guitar, backing vocals, producer
Željko Bebek - vocals, acoustic guitar
Alen Islamović - vocals
Mladen "Tifa" Vojičić - vocals
Điđi Jankelić - drums, percussion
Milić Vukašinović - drums, percussion
Laza Ristovski - keyboards
Vlado Pravdić - organ
Zoran Redžić - bass guitar

Additional personnel
Daniela Radkova Aleksandrova - backing vocals
Ludmila Radkova Traykova - backing vocals
Klapa Nostalgija - backing vocals
Wedding & Funeral Band
Dušan Vasić - engineer
Nenad Zubak - engineer
Janez Križaj - mastered by
Nikša Bratoš - mixed by
Željko Savić - technician

References

External links
Turneja 2005: Sarajevo, Zagreb, Beograd at Discogs

Bijelo Dugme live albums
2006 live albums